Troglodytes is a genus of small passerine birds in the wren family.
They are brownish above and somewhat paler below, with strong legs. Their short rounded wings and frequently cocked tail have a dark barred pattern. The flight is direct and buzzing.

Troglodytes wrens are mostly found in somewhat cooler habitats than most of their relatives. Most of the species are found in the mountains from Mexico to northern South America. Five species are found in temperate latitudes:  The house wren occurs widely in both tropical and temperate lowlands, but is frequently split into several species. Until recently, the hardy winter wren was believed to have a wide distribution in North America, Europe, Asia and North Africa, but it has recently been split into three species, of which the Eurasian wren is the only wren of any genus found outside the New World. The Cobb's wren of the Falkland Islands is another species which tolerates harsh conditions well.

Like other wrens, they are elusive as they hunt for small insects and spiders, but they readily reveal their positions through their loud songs.

These are territorial birds, but the tiny winter wren will roost communally in a cavity in cold weather to help conserve heat.

Systematics and species
The genus Troglodytes was introduced by the French ornithologist Louis Pierre Vieillot in 1809. The type species was subsequently designated as the house wren (Troglodytes aedon).

The closest living relatives of this genus are possibly the timberline wren and the Cistothorus species, rather than the Henicorhina wood-wrens as is sometimes proposed.

A number of the Troglodytes species, such as the Clarión wren, were formerly considered subspecies of the house wren, and it has been argued that at least the tropical forms of the house wren should be further split as the southern house wren, Troglodytes musculus. The Socorro wren, in older times placed into Thryomanes (Bewick's wren), is actually a close relative of the house wren complex, as indicated by "manners, song, plumage, etc." and by biogeography and mtDNA NADH dehydrogenase subunit 2 sequence analysis.

The winter wren is less closely related to the other members of the genus, and is occasionally split as the monotypic genus Nannus. It might actually be closely related to Cistothorus, but again, the molecular data is insufficient to properly resolve this issue.

Even with the help of the most recent molecular data, the relationships of the species could not be fully resolved, however. There appear to be two clades, one comprising the house wren group and another containing Central and South American species. The relationships of the rufous-browed and brown-throated wrens are indeterminable with the present molecular data; they appear fairly basal and the former might be closer to the house wren group than the latter. The Santa Marta wren is quite enigmatic and little-studied.

Species

 House wren, Troglodytes aedon – taxonomy needs revision
 Northern house wren, Troglodytes (aedon) aedon group
 Brown-throated wren, Troglodytes (aedon) brunneicollis group
 Southern house wren, Troglodytes (aedon) musculus group
 Cozumel wren, Troglodytes (aedon) beani
 Guadeloupe house wren, Troglodytes aedon guadeloupensis – taxonomic status unresolved; possibly extinct (late 20th century)
 Martinique house wren, Troglodytes aedon martinicensis – taxonomic status unresolved; possibly extinct (c. 1890)
 Clarión wren, Troglodytes tanneri – formerly included in T. aedon
 Socorro wren, Troglodytes sissonii – formerly included in T. aedon
 Cobb's wren, Troglodytes cobbi – formerly included in T. aedon
 Rufous-browed wren, Troglodytes rufociliatus
 Tepui wren, Troglodytes rufulus
 Mountain wren, Troglodytes solstitialis
 Ochraceous wren, Troglodytes ochraceus
 Santa Marta wren, Troglodytes monticola
 Winter wren, Troglodytes hiemalis
 Pacific wren, Troglodytes pacificus
 Kiska wren, Troglodytes pacificus kiskensis
 Aleutian wren, Troglodytes pacificus meligerus
 Troglodytes pacificus ochroleucus
 Tanaga wren, Troglodytes pacificus tanagensis
 Seguam wren, Troglodytes pacificus seguamensis
 Stevenson's wren, Troglodytes pacificus stevensoni
 Unalaska wren, Troglodytes pacificus petrophilus
 Semidi wren, Troglodytes pacificus semidiensis
 Alaskan wren, Troglodytes pacificus alascensis
 Troglodytes pacificus muiri
 Troglodytes pacificus obscurior
 Troglodytes pacificus salebrosus
 Kodiak wren, Troglodytes pacificus helleri 
 Eurasian wren, Troglodytes troglodytes
 Northern wren, Troglodytes troglodytes troglodytes
 Icelandic wren, Troglodytes troglodytes islandicus
 Corsican wren, Troglodytes troglodytes koenigi
 British wren, Troglodytes troglodytes indigenus
 Fair Isle wren, Troglodytes troglodytes fridariensis
 St. Kilda wren, Troglodytes troglodytes hirtensis
 Hebrides wren, Troglodytes troglodytes hebridensis
 Shetland wren, Troglodytes troglodytes zetlandicus
 Faeroe wren, Troglodytes troglodytes borealis 
 West Mediterranean wren, Troglodytes troglodytes kabylorum
 Libyan wren, Troglodytes troglodytes juniperi
 East Mediterranean wren, Troglodytes troglodytes cypriotes
 Caucasian wren, Troglodytes troglodytes hyrcanus
 Daito wren, Troglodytes troglodytes orii – validity doubtful; extinct (c. 1940)
  Troglodytes troglodytes dauricus
 Troglodytes troglodytes idius
 Kuril Islands wren, Troglodytes troglodytes kurilensis
 Magrath's wren, Troglodytes troglodytes magrathi
 Troglodytes troglodytes mosukei
 Caucasian wren, Troglodytes troglodytes neglectus
 Troglodytes troglodytes szetschuanus
 Troglodytes troglodytes talifuensis
 Sooty wren, Troglodytes troglodytes fumigatus
 Nepal wren, Troglodytes troglodytes nipalensis
 Troglodytes troglodytes pallescens
 Troglodytes troglodytes zagrossiensis
 Tian Shan wren, Troglodytes troglodytes tianschanicus
 Troglodytes troglodytes ogawae
 Troglodytes troglodytes taivanus
 Troglodytes troglodytes subpallidus

References

Further reading
 ffrench, Richard; O'Neill, John Patton & Eckelberry, Don R. (1991): A guide to the birds of Trinidad and Tobago (2nd edition). Comstock Publishing, Ithaca, N.Y. 
 Hilty, Steven L. (2003): Birds of Venezuela. Christopher Helm, London. 
 National Geographic Society (2002): Field Guide to the Birds of North America. National Geographic, Washington DC. 
 Rice, Peterson and Escalona-Segura: Phylogenetic patterns in montane Troglodytes wrens
 Stiles, F. Gary & Skutch, Alexander Frank (1989): A guide to the birds of Costa Rica. Comistock, Ithaca. 
 Svensson, Lars; Zetterström, Dan; Mullarney, Killian & Grant, P. J. (1999): Collins bird guide. Harper & Collins, London.

External links 

 Wren videos, photos and facts at Arkive.org 

 
Bird genera
Wrens
Taxa named by Louis Jean Pierre Vieillot